Hakea decurrens, commonly known as  bushy needlewood, is a species  of shrub or small tree in the family Proteaceae.

Description
Smaller branches have short densely matted silky hairs, occasionally some quickly becoming smooth. The  inflorescence consists 1-6 white or pink flowers on a short white or rusty slightly hairy or densely matted hairy short stalk. A profusion of flowers appear in leaf axils from May to September.

Taxonomy and naming
Hakea decurrens was first formally described in 1830 by Robert Brown in Supplementum primum prodromi florae Novae Hollandiae.
The specific epithet (decurrens) is a Latin word, meaning "decurrent" or "prolonged below the point of insertion",  referring to the insertion of the leaf on the stem.

In 1996 William Robert Barker described  three subspecies of Hakea decurrens in the Journal of the Adelaide Botanic Gardens and the names are accepted by the Australian Plant Census

The main differences are their fruit and hair characteristics on smaller branches.

 Hakea decurrens subsp. physocarpa has flattened hairs, quickly lost.

Distribution and habitat
The species is native and widespread in New South Wales, Victoria and Tasmania in Australia. Additionally it is naturalised in South Australia and Portugal.

Three subspecies are currently recognised:
 H.decurrens subsp. decurrens, occurs on the western slopes and plains of the Great Dividing Range of New South Wales; 
 H.decurrens subsp. platytaenia, occurs in exposed coastal heaths in southeastern New South Wales, eastern Victoria and the Bass Strait Islands.
 H.decurrens subsp. physocarpa, occurs in New South Wales, Victoria and the Bass Strait Islands.  In Tasmania it is thought to be native to the north and naturalised in the south. It is also naturalised in the Mount Lofty Ranges in South Australia and Portugal.

References

decurrens
Flora of New South Wales
Flora of Tasmania
Flora of Victoria (Australia)